Dunsland Cross was a railway station on the Bude Branch that closed in 1966. Dunsland Cross station in the parish of Holsworthy was 6 miles East of the village, now town of Holsworthy. The station was opened in 1879 by the London and South Western Railway (LSWR) when Holsworthy station was the terminus of the line, some years before the route to serve the coastal town of Bude was finally opened in 1898.

The station had been proposed for closure in the Beeching Report. The station served the remote rural communities around Dunsland Cross.

History 

The LSWR's branch line from Okehampton to Bude took nineteen years and four Acts of Parliament. The original line had been authorised as far as Holsworthy where a station was opened on 20 January 1879. The Holsworthy and Bude Railway Act (c.ccii) was passed on 20 August 1883. However no works were commenced on the extension and the deadline for completion of the line by October 1891 was looking unlikely to be met, resulting in the LSWR asking for an extra year to complete the works. Nevertheless, since by the end of 1891 no progress had been made, a further bill was promoted seeking the abandonment of the line; the Act, the Holsworthy and Bude Rly. Abandonment Act (c.xx), was passed on 20 May 1892. This did not deter the residents of Stratton and Bude who, in 1894, successfully lobbied the LSWR to promote a second bill. The Act was passed on 6 July 1895 and authorised a somewhat different route than that set out in the first Act.

The Station 
The line was single track; however, a signal box with a passing loop was located here with sidings, a cattle pen and a goods shed. Several railway workers cottages were built here and these are now private dwellings (2012). The station had a ticket office and waiting room with a simple shelter on the second platform. The station name board also informed passengers that this was the station for Shebbear College.

Services
Passenger services were never very frequent. The pattern of services changed after the handover of the line to the Western Region of British Railways from 1 January 1963 when services became more local and the through-coaches to Waterloo were discontinued. Bude had a local shuttle service to and from Okehampton for the final months of its existence.

The Station today 
The station itself is a private dwelling and as stated the railway cottages survive. The hamlet has been named Dunsland Cross Station.

References
Notes

Sources

External links
 Dunsland Cross station in 1966

Disused railway stations in Devon
Former London and South Western Railway stations
Railway stations in Great Britain opened in 1879
Railway stations in Great Britain closed in 1966
Beeching closures in England
Torridge District